Phylloceras serum is an extinct species of ammonoid cephalopods belonging to the family Phylloceratidae. These nektonic carnivores lived from Early Jurassic to Late Cretaceous (from 150,8 to 125.45 Ma).

Distribution
Fossils of species within this genus have been found in the Cretaceous of Austria, Mexico, Morocco, Poland, South Africa, Ukraine and in the Jurassic of Hungary and Italy.

References

 Cyril Walker & David Ward (1993) - Fossielen: Sesam Natuur Handboeken, Bosch & Keuning, Baarn. 

Jurassic ammonites
Cretaceous ammonites